= Thorium heptaphosphide =

Identifiers
CAS Number	102499-33-2
3D model (JSmol)	Interactive image
- InChI: InChI=1S/7P.Th/q;;;4*-1;+4 Key: LNJLDCGWEAURNN-UHFFFAOYSA-N
- SMILES: [Th+4].[P-].[P-].[P-].[P-].[P].[P].[P]

Properties
Chemical formula	P_{7}Th
Molar mass	448.8540 g·mol^{−1}
Appearance	black rod-shaped crystals
Density	4.93 g/cm^{3}
- Except where otherwise noted, data are given for materials in their standard state (at 25 °C [77 °F], 100 kPa). Infobox references

Thorium heptaphosphide is a binary inorganic compound of thorium metal and phosphorus with the chemical formula ThP_{7}. This is the most phosphorus-rich binary compound of a tetravalent thorium.

== Synthesis ==
Thorium heptaphosphide can be synthesized from the elements with addition of iodine at 830 K.

== Properties ==
Thorium heptaphosphide forms black rod-shaped crystals of orthorhombic crystal system. It decomposes to Th_{2}P_{11} at 650 K in vacuo.
